The Ephemeral Museum is an ephemeral art museum located in Bairro Alto, Lisbon, Portugal. It is sponsored by Pampero Fundación and is part of the Pampero Rum campaign, developed by Leo Burnett Lisboa advertising agency.

The idea began when Leo Burnett set up a marketing plan for Pampero rum, creating a place where everyday street artists could be acknowledged. In July 2008, the first location opened in Bairro Alto – Lisbon's Bohemian quarter. Its success was immediate, and additional locations soon opened São Bento and Amoreiras.

The Bairro Alto location exhibits the works of international artists Dolk and Jef Aerosol, as well as local artists in the making such as Efeito Magenta and O Colectivo Bitmap. Meanwhile, the São Bento and Amoreiras locations renown such artists like Exas, Creyz, Rote, Eko and Mito, Time, Pariz, Youth, From the Cave, Mace, as well as the international Kenor.

When determining which artworks to showcase, careful analysis of street art manifestations take place (graffiti, stencils, stickers) in order to separate true art from vandalism. The artworks are identified and catalogued (author and title). 
The project is not an incentive for graffiti creation and acts of vandalism (which are normally associated with street art), but instead aims to draw attention to the need of a space that voices out and exhibits this style of art as an independent form of manifestation from vandalism, similar to the example in the Tate Modern Museum, in London.

Art museums and galleries in Portugal
Art museums established in 2008
2008 establishments in Portugal
Museums in Lisbon
Ephemera